Landestheater Oberpfalz is a theatre company based in Bavaria, Germany.

Upper Palatine Forest
Theatre companies in Germany